ATIME can refer to one of the following:

 Asociación de Trabajadores Inmigrantes Marroquíes en España, Association of Moroccan Immigrant Workers in Spain 
 atime, a file's last 'access time', part of the stat (system call) in Unix
 ATIME(f(n)) is the class of problems solvable by an alternating Turing machine in time f(n)